Hereford was, until 2010, a constituency of the House of Commons of the Parliament of the United Kingdom. Since 1918, it had elected one Member of Parliament (MP) by the first-past-the-post voting system.

Previously, Hereford had been a parliamentary borough which from 1295 to 1885 had elected two MPs, using the bloc vote system in contested elections. Under the Redistribution of Seats Act 1885 the borough's representation had been reduced to one seat at the 1885 general election, and for the 1918 general election the borough was abolished and replaced with a county division which carried the same name but covered a wider geographical area.

History

Hereford sent two representatives to Parliament from the beginning of the reign of Edward I. Although a county town, the early elections were always held at a different location from those of the shire, the former taking place at the Guildhall, the latter in the castle.

In 1885, representation was reduced to one Member.

Journalist Robin Day stood as the Liberal candidate in the 1959 general election.

From 1931 until 1997, Hereford was held by the Conservative Party, before being taken by Paul Keetch of the Liberal Democrats at the 1997 general election. Keetch served as the Liberal Democrats' spokesman for defence from October 1999 until May 2005, and announced on 17 November 2006 that he would not be standing at the next election.

Following the review by the Boundary Commission for England of parliamentary representation in Herefordshire, taking effect at the 2010 general election, two parliamentary constituencies were allocated to the county. The Hereford seat was abolished and replaced by the Hereford and South Herefordshire seat, while the remainder of the county is covered by the North Herefordshire seat.

Boundaries
1918–1950: The Borough of Hereford, the Urban Districts of Ledbury and Ross-on-Wye, the Rural Districts of Dore, Ross, and Whitchurch, and parts of the Rural Districts of Hereford and Ledbury.

1950–1983: The Borough of Hereford, the Urban District of Ross-on-Wye, the Rural Districts of Dore and Bredwardine, and Ross and Whitchurch, and part of the Rural District of Hereford.

1983–1997: The City of Hereford, and the District of South Herefordshire wards of Backbury, Broad Oak, Dinedor Hill, Doward, Fownhope, Garron, Golden Valley, Gorsley, Gorsty, Harewood End, Hollington, Kingsthorne, Merbach, Olchon, Old Gore, Penyard, Pontrilas, Ross-on-Wye East, Ross-on-Wye West, Stoney Street, Tram Inn, Walford, Whitfield, and Wilton.

1997–2010: The City of Hereford, and the District of South Herefordshire wards of Broad Oak, Clehonger East, Clehonger West, Dinedor Hill, Doward, Fownhope, Garron, Golden Valley, Gorsley, Harewood End, Hollington, Kingsthorne, Merbach, Olchon, Old Gore, Penyard, Pontrilas, Ross-on-Wye East, Ross-on-Wye West, Stoney Street, Tram Inn, Walford, Whitfield, and Wilton.

In its final form, the Hereford constituency contained the city of Hereford and most of South Herefordshire, including Ross-on-Wye, but excluding Ledbury and Much Marcle, both of which were in the Leominster constituency.

Members of Parliament

MPs 1295–1640

MPs 1640–1885

MPs 1885–2010

Elections

Elections in the 1830s

Elections in the 1840s

 
 
 

Hobhouse resigned by accepting the office of Steward of the Chiltern Hundreds, causing a by-election.

 
 

Clive's death caused a by-election.

Elections in the 1850s

 
 
 

Price resigned, causing a by-election.

Elections in the 1860s

 
 
 

 

 
 
 

The election was declared void on petition, after the Liberal agent was found to have "given breakfast to Liberal electors", and therefore was guilty of treating.

Elections in the 1870s
Clive resigned, causing a by-election.

 
 

 
 

 

Pateshall resigned, causing a by-election.

Elections in the 1880s

Elections in the 1890s 

Grenfell resigned, causing a by-election.

Elections in the 1900s

Elections in the 1910s 

General Election 1914–15:

Another General Election was required to take place before the end of 1915. The political parties had been making preparations for an election to take place and by July 1914, the following candidates had been selected; 
Unionist: William Hewins
Liberal:

Elections in the 1920s

Elections in the 1930s

Elections in the 1940s 
General Election 1939–40:

Another General Election was required to take place before the end of 1940. The political parties had been making preparations for an election to take place from 1939 and by the end of this year, the following candidates had been selected; 
Conservative: James Thomas
Liberal: Archie Marshall

Elections in the 1950s

Elections in the 1960s

Elections in the 1970s

Elections in the 1980s

Elections in the 1990s

Elections in the 2000s

See also
 List of parliamentary constituencies in Herefordshire and Worcestershire

External links
 UK Constituency Maps
 Hereford Liberal Democrats
 Hereford Conservatives
 Labour in Herefordshire
 UKIP West Midlands
 Herefordshire Green Party

Notes

References and notes

Sources
 Robert Beatson, A Chronological Register of Both Houses of Parliament (London: Longman, Hurst, Res & Orme, 1807) 
 D Brunton & D H Pennington, Members of the Long Parliament (London: George Allen & Unwin, 1954)
 Cobbett's Parliamentary history of England, from the Norman Conquest in 1066 to the year 1803 (London: Thomas Hansard, 1808) 
 The Constitutional Year Book for 1913 (London: National Union of Conservative and Unionist Associations, 1913)
 F W S Craig, British Parliamentary Election Results 1832–1885 (2nd edition, Aldershot: Parliamentary Research Services, 1989)
 F W S Craig, British Parliamentary Election Results 1918–1949 (Glasgow: Political Reference Publications, 1969)
 Maija Jansson (ed.), Proceedings in Parliament, 1614 (House of Commons) (Philadelphia: American Philosophical Society, 1988) 
 J E Neale, The Elizabethan House of Commons (London: Jonathan Cape, 1949)

Politics of Hereford
Parliamentary constituencies in Herefordshire (historic)
Constituencies of the Parliament of the United Kingdom established in 1295
Constituencies of the Parliament of the United Kingdom disestablished in 2010
Herefordshire-related lists